Campi, also known as Campi di Norcia, is a frazione of the comune of Norcia in the province of Perugia, Umbria, Italy. The medieval village has a population of around 200 people. Many of its landmarks, including the Church of San Salvatore, were heavily damaged during the October 2016 Central Italy earthquakes.

History
The area around Campi was first settled in Sabine and Roman times. The Sabine and Roman town was located in the valley where the Church of San Salvatore was eventually built, and by the medieval period this area became known as Campi Vecchio (Old Campi). In the Middle Ages, a fortified settlement was established on the hill overlooking the Roman settlement, and this was known as Campi Nuovo (New Campi). In time, the names were reversed, with the medieval Campi Nuovo being renamed Campi Vecchio and vice versa. Modern Campi consists of Campi Nuovo in valley and Campi Alto on the hill.

A number of buildings in the village were destroyed during the October 2016 Central Italy earthquakes, including the Churches of San Salvatore and Santa Maria delle Grazie.

Geography

It has panoramic views over the Castoriana valley. It had a population of 172 according to the ISTAT census of 2001.

Economy
Agriculture and the cultivation of lentils and barley are important for the local economy.

Campi was visited by tourists due to its proximity to the Monti Sibillini National Park.

Culture
Two important events are the gastronomy and culture festival Il Castello del Gusto, which is held in the first weekend of August, and the feast of Our Lady of the Cross in the first weekend of September.

Places of interest

Church of San Salvatore – a church with ancient origins, rebuilt between the 14th and 15th centuries. It was well known for the late 15th-century frescoes in its interior. The church collapsed in the 2016 earthquake.
Madonna con San Giuseppe di Jacopo Siculo (1507)
Church of San Lorenzo
Church of Santa Lucia
 – a 16th-century church which had a frescoed façade. Parts of the church including the façade collapsed in the 2016 earthquake.
Church of Santa Maria di Piazza – a church with a frescoed interior founded in 1351.
Church of the Madonna del Condotto
 – collapsed in the 2016 earthquake.

References

External links

Frazioni of the Province of Perugia
Norcia